Visborg is a commuter town in Mariagerfjord municipality, a few kilometers east of Hadsund. In the geographic region of the Jutland peninsula known as Himmerland in northern Denmark. The town has a population of 417 (1 January 2022).

References

Hadsund